Adda or ADDA may refer to:

People

Given name 

 Adda Husted Andersen (1898–1990), Danish-born American Modernist jeweler, silversmith, metalsmith, and educator
 Adda Angel, Cambodian songwriter and music producer
 Adda bar Ahavah, two Jewish rabbis and Talmudic scholars
 Adda Djeziri (born 1988), Algerian-Danish footballer
 Adda Gleason (1888–1971), American actress
 Adda of Bernicia (fl. 559–580), third ruler of the Anglo-Saxon Kingdom of Bernicia

Surname 
 Elie Adda (fl. 1928), Egyptian fencer
 Georges Adda (1916–2008), Tunisian politician and trade unionist
 Gruffudd ab Adda (fl. mid 14th century), Welsh language poet and musician
 Joseph Kofi Adda (1956–2021), Ghanaian politician
 Serge Adda (1948–2004), French television executive

Places 

 Adda (river), a tributary of the Po in North Italy.

 Adda Motiram, a village in India
 Adda River (disambiguation), several rivers with this name

Other uses 
 ADDA (amino acid), a non-proteinogenic amino acid
 Adda (2013 film), a Telugu film
 Adda (2019 film), a Bengali film
 Adda Records, a French record label, now part of Accord
 Adda (South Asian), a type of conversation in South Asia, especial Bengal, also Addabazi
 Amar, después de amar, Argentine telenovela, shortened as "ADDA" in the logo

See also 
 AD/DA: the combination of Analog-to-Digital and Digital-to-Analog converters
 Addas, early convert to Islam